Niko Lozančić (born 3 September 1957) is a Bosnian Croat politician who served as the 7th President of the Federation of Bosnia and Herzegovina from 27 January 2003 until 22 February 2007.

He is a member and former deputy president of the Croatian Democratic Union. Lozančić was also a member of the national House of Representatives from 2007 to 2014. During his time in office, Lozančić served as Chaiman of the House of Representatives two separate times between 2008 and 2010. Professionally, he is a lawyer and a diplomat.

References

1957 births
Living people
People from Kakanj
Croats of Bosnia and Herzegovina
Bosnia and Herzegovina diplomats
Presidents of the Federation of Bosnia and Herzegovina
Politicians of the Federation of Bosnia and Herzegovina
Croatian Democratic Union of Bosnia and Herzegovina politicians
Members of the House of Representatives (Bosnia and Herzegovina)
Chairmen of the House of Representatives (Bosnia and Herzegovina)